Eupithecia descimoni is a moth in the  family Geometridae. It is found in Ecuador, Peru and Bolivia.

Subspecies
Eupithecia descimoni descimoni
Eupithecia descimoni ecuador Kocak, 2004 (Ecuador)

References

Moths described in 1987
descimoni
Moths of South America